Henry Reginald Gamble (6 November 1859 – 9 August 1931) was an Anglican priest and author. He was the Dean of Exeter in the Church of England from 1918 to 1931.

Gamble was educated at Oriel College, Oxford and ordained in 1885. He held curacies at All Saints, Molton, Devon St Mark's, Hamilton Terrace and St Andrew's, Wells Street. From 1895 to  1902 he was Vicar of St Botolph's Aldersgate and then Rector of Holy Trinity, Sloane Street, with St Jude's, Sloane Court. An Honorary Chaplain to the King and  Select Preacher at Lincoln's Inn, he was a Canon of Westminster  and Rector of St John the Evangelist until his appointment to the Deanery. He died in post.

In 1906 he was elected to Chelsea Borough Council as a Municipal Reform Party councillor representing Royal Hospital Ward. He served as Mayor of Chelsea in 1908–09, and was re-elected to the council for a second three-year term in 1909.

He married Helen Maud Isherwood, and had two children: Patrick Gamble and Anthea Rosemary Gamble Carew.

(All the above places and streets except for Molton and Exeter are in London.)

References

Municipal Reform Party politicians
Members of Chelsea Metropolitan Borough Council
Mayors of places in Greater London
Deans of Exeter
Honorary Chaplains to the King
Alumni of Oriel College, Oxford
1931 deaths
1859 births
Canons of Westminster